Solute carrier family 2, facilitated glucose transporter member 10 is a protein that in humans is encoded by the SLC2A10 gene.

SLC2A10 is a member of the facilitative glucose transporter family, which plays a significant role in maintaining glucose homeostasis.[supplied by OMIM]

See also
 Glucose transporter
 Solute carrier family
 Arterial tortuosity syndrome

References

Further reading

Solute carrier family